Twinsburg Heights is a census-designated place (CDP) in Summit County, Ohio, United States, composed of 14 streets in Twinsburg, Ohio. The population was 925 at the 2010 census.

Geography

Demographics

As of the census of 2010, there were 925 people living in the CDP.  The racial makeup of the CDP was 10.1% White, 81.4% African American, 0.02% Native American, 0.03% Asian, 0.5% from other races, and 5.8% from two or more races. Hispanic or Latino of any race were 1.6% of the population.

The median income for a household in the CDP was $49,232. The per capita income for the CDP was $28,398. 61.8% of the population were living below the poverty line.

References

Census-designated places in Summit County, Ohio